A historical map may be:
an old map (a map that is itself a historical artefact), see history of cartography
a map  depicting a specific historical period, see historical atlas

See also
List of historical maps
List of atlases